Andiamo (Italian for "let's go") may refer to:

Music

Albums
Andiamo (album), by Authority Zero
Andiamo, a project album of Doug Katsaros

Songs
"Andiamo", song by Ezio Pinza, from film Mr. Imperium lyrics by Dorothy Fields, music by Harold Arlen
"Andiamo", song by Jerry Vale, B-side of "Have You Looked into Your Heart" 1964
"Andiamo", song by Johnny Wade Adair Ling Dicks 1962 
"Andiamo", song by The Monochrome Set Stephen Foster The Lost Weekend 1984
"Andiamo", song by 1200 Techniques from Choose One
"Andiamo", song by Tom Wilson 1995 
"Andiamo", song by Enrico Ruggeri written E. Ruggeri Gli Occi del Musicista 2003
"Andiamo", song by rapper Fabri Fibra written Nesly Rice from Mr. Simpatia 2004
"Andiamo", song by Nerone from album 100K 2005

Other uses
Andiamo, poems by Franco Beltrametti, Harry Hoogstraten and James Koller (1978)
Andiamo (horse)
Andiamo, shoe retailer, part of Kesko
Andiamo!, sometimes exclaimed after winning a point in pickleball
Andiamo Systems